Loudun (Poitevin: Loudin) is a commune in the Vienne department and the region of Nouvelle-Aquitaine, western France.

The area south of Loudun is the place of origin of a significant portion of the Acadians, one of the early founding people of New France in Canada.

Demographics

Sights
An ancient town, Loudun contains numerous old streets, and buildings and monuments of which five are Government-listed monuments. It is also the location of a vicus type archaeological site.

History
 The Treaty of Loudun, negotiated and signed in Loudun on May 3, 1616, temporarily resolved the power struggle for control of the French government between the Prince of Condé (next in line for Louis XIII's throne) and queen mother Marie de Medici's favorite Concino Concini, Marquis of Ancre. 
 Loudun was also the site of mass hysteria surrounding the supposed mass possession of Ursuline nuns by the Devil in 1634 (see Loudun possessions).

Loudun in art
 Eyvind Johnson's 1949 novel Drömmar om rosor och eld was based on the Loudun possessions.
 Aldous Huxley's 1952 non-fiction novel The Devils of Loudun was also based on the Loudun possessions.
 John Whiting's 1961 theatre play The Devils, commissioned by Sir Peter Hall for the Royal Shakespeare Company, was based on Aldous Huxley's novel.
 A Polish film, Mother Joan of the Angels (1961), is based on Jarosław Iwaszkiewicz short story which transposes the story to Poland.
 Krzysztof Penderecki's 1969 opera The Devils of Loudun (Die Teufel von Loudun), which premiered at the Hamburg State Opera, was based on Huxley's novel and Whiting's play.
 Ken Russell's 1971 film The Devils was based on Huxley's novel and Whiting's play.

Personalities
Loudun is the birthplace of:
 Jean Salmon Macrin (1490–1557), Neo-Latin poet
 Théophraste Renaudot (1586–1653), medical practitioner, inventor of French written press, journalist, philanthropist
 Ismaël Bullialdus (1604–1694), astronomer
 Jean-Charles Cornay, martyr.
 Marie Besnard, accused of poisoning in the 1950s in what was a very mediatized trial; her story was the subject of a successful TV movie and of several books
 René Monory, mayor of Loudun, senator of Vienne, president of the French Senate, Minister of Education, president of the Vienne General Council, fonder of the Futuroscope park of Poitiers
 Nicolas Ghesquière (born 1972), creative director of the French fashion house Balenciaga was born in 1972 in Comines, Nord-Pas-de-Calais but was always raised in Loudun where his parents own a golf course.

Loudun is the place of death of:
 Urbain Grandier (18 August 1634), French Catholic priest who was burned at the stake after being convicted of witchcraft.
 André Andrejew (16 March 1967), French-Russian classic film production designer, built decors for movies produced in Germany, France, England and the US.

Twin towns
 Ouagadougou, Burkina Faso
 Audun le Tiche, France
 Shippagan, Canada
 Leuze, Belgium
 Burgos, Spain
 Thibodaux, USA

See also
 Lugus
 Communes of the Vienne department

References

External links

http://www.ville-loudun.Fr

Loudon
Anjou